Corruption in Illinois has been a problem from the earliest history of the state. Electoral fraud in Illinois pre-dates the territory's admission to the Union in 1818. Illinois had the third most federal criminal convictions for public corruption between 1976 and 2012, behind New York and California. A study published by the University of Illinois Chicago in 2022 ranked Illinois as the second most corrupt state in the nation, with 4 out of the last 11 governors serving time in prison.

Federal
Several members of Illinois's delegation to the United States Congress have been convicted of crimes.

U.S. Senate
 William Lorimer (R) U.S. Senator from 1909 to 1912.  The Senate voted that Lorimer's election used corrupt practices and vote buying and declared it invalid. He was then removed from office.

U.S. House of Representatives
 Dan Crane (R), a U.S. congressman from 1979 to 1985, was censured in the 1983 congressional page sex scandal for having sex with a young congressional page. Crane was defeated for re-election in 1984 and returned to dentistry.
 Dan Rostenkowski (D) was a U.S. congressman from Chicago for 36 years, from 1959 to 1995.  He was chairman of the House Ways and Means Committee from 1981 to 1994.  After a federal investigation he was accused of various acts of corruption, such as accepting kickbacks, using official funds for personal expenses, and participating in what became known as the Congressional Post Office scandal.  In 1996 he pleaded guilty to two counts of mail fraud and was sentenced to 17 months in prison.
 Dennis Hastert (R) was a congressman from 1987 to 2007.  He was the longest-serving Republican Speaker of the House, from 1999 to 2007. In 2006, Hastert became embroiled in controversy over his championing of a $207-million federal earmark (inserted in the 2005 omnibus highway bill) for the Prairie Parkway, a proposed expressway running through his district. The Sunlight Foundation accused Hastert of failing to disclose that the construction of the highway would benefit a land investment that Hastert and his wife made in nearby land in 2004 and 2005. Hastert received five-eighths of the proceeds of the sale of the land, turning a $1.8 million profit in under two years. Hastert's ownership interest in the tract was not a public record because the land was held by a blind land trust, Little Rock Trust No. 225.  There were three partners in the trust: Hastert, Thomas Klatt, and Dallas Ingemunson.  However, public documents only named Ingemunson, who was the Kendall County Republican Party chairman and Hastert's personal attorney and longtime friend. Hastert denied any wrongdoing. In October 2006, Norman Ornstein and Scott Lilly wrote that the Prairie Parkway affair was "worse than FoleyGate" and called for the Speaker's resignation.  In 2015, Hastert pleaded guilty to structuring bank withdrawals to evade bank reporting requirements, a felony.  In 2016 he was sentenced to 15 months in prison.  At his sentencing hearing, he admitted that he had molested several boys when he was a high school wrestling coach in the 1960s and 1970s, and that he had used the improperly withdrawn funds to buy the silence of one of the victims.
 Mel Reynolds (D) was a U.S. representative from 1993 to 1995.  He resigned from Congress after being convicted of having sex with an underage campaign worker.  While serving a five-year prison sentence, Reynolds was convicted in 1997 of unrelated charges of bank fraud and using campaign finances for personal expenses.  He received a -year sentence but was released in 2001 when his sentence was commuted by President Clinton.  In 2017 Reynolds was found guilty of failing to file federal income tax returns. He received a six-month sentence for this third conviction.
 Jesse Jackson, Jr. (D) succeeded Mel Reynolds as congressman from Illinois's 2nd congressional district, serving from 1995 until his resignation in 2012.  On February 8, 2013, Jackson admitted to violating federal campaign law by using campaign funds to make personal purchases. Jackson pleaded guilty on February 20, 2013, to one count of wire and mail fraud. On August 14, 2013, he was sentenced to 30 months in federal prison.
 Aaron Schock (R) represented , serving from 2009 until 2015. In March 2015, after controversy about his use of federal funds, Schock resigned from Congress. In November 2016, a federal grand jury indicted Schock on 24 criminal counts including theft of government funds, fraud, making false statements, and filing false tax returns.  Schock pleaded "not guilty" to all charges when arraigned on Monday, December 12, 2016.

State

Governors
 Len Small (R) the 26th governor, was found to have defrauded the state of a million dollars.
 Otto Kerner, Jr. (D) was 33rd Governor of Illinois, serving from 1961 to 1968.  Following a 1973 trial in which his prosecutor was future Illinois governor James R. Thompson, Kerner was convicted on 17 counts of mail fraud, conspiracy, perjury, and related charges.  
 Dan Walker (D) was the 36th Governor of Illinois, serving from 1973 to 1977.  After leaving office he pursued various business interests, and acquired the First American Savings and Loan Association, which was later declared insolvent as part of the savings and loan crisis.  In 1987 Walker pleaded guilty to bank fraud and perjury for receiving improper loans from First American.  He was sentenced to seven years in prison, and was released after serving a year and a half.
 George Ryan (R) was the 39th governor of Illinois, serving from 1999 to 2003.  Before that he was secretary of state from 1991 to 1999.  In 2006 he was found guilty of fraud and racketeering charges for various acts that he committed in these two offices.  He was sentenced to six and a half years in prison.
 Rod Blagojevich (D) was the 40th Governor of Illinois, serving from 2003 to 2009. He was the only Illinois governor to be impeached by the state House of Representatives and removed from office by the state Senate.  In 2011 Blagojevich was found guilty of 18 counts of corruption, including attempting to sell or trade an appointment to fill Barack Obama's vacant seat in the U.S. Senate.  He was sentenced to 14 years in prison.  In February 2020, after he had served about eight years of his term, his sentence was commuted by President Donald Trump.

State officials
 Orville Hodge (R) was the Auditor of Public Accounts (predecessor office to the Illinois Comptroller) from 1952 to 1956. During his term in office, he embezzled  state funds, mainly by altering and forging checks that were paid on the state's account.   and was sentenced to a 12- to 15-year prison term, of which he served 6 years.

Paul Powell (D) was the Secretary of State. Though his salary was never more than $30,000 per year, after he died in 1970, his hotel room was found to contain $750,000 in cash kept in shoe boxes, briefcases and strong boxes, while his office had $50,000 in cash as well as 19 cases of whiskey and $1 million in racing stocks. Powell left an estate of $4.6 million, which a federal investigation determined Powell had mostly acquired through bribes he received for giving noncompetitive state contracts to political associates.

John F. Wall (R) State Representative from Chicago in District 23, was found guilty of conspiracy and attempted extortion for accepting a $2,000 bribe in exchange for laws benefitting private employment agencies. He was found guilty and sentenced to five years in prison. (1971)

Walter C. McAvoy (R) State Representative from Chicago, was convicted of extorting a $2,000 bribe from private employment agencies in return for favorable legislation. He was found guilty and sentenced to five years in prison.  (1978)

William J. Scott (R) Attorney General convicted of tax fraud and sentenced to a year in prison (1982).
Jerome Cosentino (D) served two nonconsecutive terms as Illinois Treasurer, from 1979 to 1983, and from 1987 to 1991.  In 1992 he pleaded guilty to defrauding two banks of several million dollars in a check kiting scheme.  He was sentenced to nine months of home confinement.

Ron Stephens (Illinois politician) (R) State Representative from Greenville in the 102nd District, was arrested for DUI.  He was found guilty, and since he had previous arrests for drug abuse, he was given 12 months of supervision, his license was revoked and he was required to take monthly drug tests.  He then resigned his seat. (2010)

 Frank Mautino (D) is, the Auditor General, the state's chief financial watchdog. In May 2017 his former legislative campaign was fined $5,000 for willfully failing to provide information to an investigation of the campaign's spending.

Nick Sauer (R) State Representative from the 51st District, was accused by his ex-girlfriend of posting revenge porn pictures on a fake Instagram account.  Top GOP leaders urged him to resign, which he did. (2018)

Martin Sandoval (D) was a state senator and chairman of the Senate Transportation Committee.  In 2020 he pleaded guilty to bribery and tax evasion, admitting that he had taken more than $250,000 in bribes in exchange for actions favorable to SafeSpeed, a red light camera company.

Luis Arroyo (D) was a state representative.  He resigned in 2019 after being charged with bribery for accepting payments to promote legislation favorable to the proliferation of sweepstakes machines.  In 2021 he pleaded guilty.  In 2022 he was sentenced to four years and nine months in prison.

Municipal
 In the 1980s, a federal task force known as Operation Greylord investigated corruption and malfeasance in the Cook County court system.  Dozens of people, including judges, attorneys, police officers, and court officials, were eventually convicted of various crimes.
In the 1990s, Operation Silver Shovel was an investigation by the Federal Bureau of Investigation into political corruption in Chicago.  Eighteen individuals, including six aldermen, were convicted of crimes.  "At its conclusion, Silver Shovel had uncovered everything from labor union corruption to drug trafficking and organized crime activity," according to the FBI.
Fred Roti (D) served as an Illinois state senator (1951–1957).  When his seat was lost to redistricting, he returned to precinct work, and took a patronage job as a drain inspector with the City Department of Water and Sewers. In 1990 Roti was indicted for racketeering and extortion. On January 15, 1993, after deliberating  days, a federal jury convicted Roti of taking thousands of dollars in bribes. The jury convicted him on all 11 counts of racketeering, racketeering conspiracy, bribery and extortion. The jury found him guilty of two out of three "fixing" charges, convicting him of taking $10,000 for influencing a civil court case and $7,500 to support a routine zoning change, both in 1989. But the jury cleared him of the most serious allegation, sharing $72,500 for fixing a Chinatown murder trial in 1981.
Betty Loren-Maltese (R) was the town president of Cicero from 1993 to 2002.  She was convicted of helping to steal $12 million from a municipal insurance fund, and in 2003 was sentenced to eight years in prison.  Cicero police chief Emil Schullo was among several others who served time for participating in the same scheme.
Nicholas Blase served as mayor of Niles for 47 years, from 1961 to 2008.  He resigned amid federal charges that he participated in an insurance kickback scheme.  Several months later he pleaded guilty to mail fraud and tax evasion, and admitted that he had pressured local businesses to buy insurance from a friend's agency in return for a share of the commissions, receiving more than $420,000 over a period of more than 30 years.  In 2010 Blase, then 81 years old, was sentenced to a year and a day in prison.
Rita Crundwell (R) comptroller and treasurer for Dixon was arrested for fraud in 2012 after embezzling about $54 million over many years.  The money was used to support a lavish lifestyle and her horse ranch, the Meri-J.  She pleaded guilty to wire fraud and was sentenced to 19 years and 7 months in prison.
William Beavers (D) was a Cook County commissioner from 2006 to 2013.  Before that he was a Chicago alderman from 1983 to 2006.  In 2013 he was convicted of failing to pay taxes on hundreds of thousands of dollars he took out of his campaign fund and used for gambling and other personal expenses.  He served a six-month sentence.
Barbara Byrd-Bennett (D) was the head of Chicago's cash-strapped public school system.  In 2015, she resigned over a $20,500,000 no-bid contract to her former employer SUPES Academy.  She subsequently pled guilty to multiple charges and was sentenced to four and a half years in prison.
In 2016, the state of Illinois filed a lawsuit against mayor Eric Kellogg and other officials of the city of Harvey, calling for an investigation into allegations of corruption and financial issues.  The lawsuit also asked the court to invalidate the mayor's unilateral removal of several aldermen who opposed him.
In 2018, David Webb, the former mayor of Markham, pleaded guilty to charges of wire fraud and income tax evasion, in connection with a $300,000 bribery scheme.  In 2021 he was sentenced to two years in prison.
In 2019 Donald Schupek pleaded guilty to embezzling $27,000 from the village of Posen when he was the mayor there.
In 2021 Louis Presta, the mayor of Crestwood, resigned and pleaded guilty to taking a $5,000 cash bribe for favorable treatment of SafeSpeed, a red light camera company that did business with the town.  In 2022 he was sentenced to a year in prison.
Tony Ragucci was mayor of Oakbrook Terrace from 2009 to 2020.  In 2022 he pleaded guilty to taking $88,000 in a red light camera kickback scheme.

Chicago aldermen
According to The Economists profile of Edward Burke, "Criminality among the city’s 50 aldermen is also astonishingly common."  Dozens of Chicago aldermen (city council members) have been convicted of corruption-related crimes.
 Thomas E. Keane (D), chairman of the Chicago City Council Finance Committee, was convicted in 1974 of mail fraud and conspiracy charges associated with questionable real estate deals.  He was sentenced to five years in prison, and served a 22-month term.
 William Carothers was convicted in 1983 of extorting as much as $32,500 in remodeling work for his ward office from the builders of Bethany Hospital.  He was sentenced to three years in prison.
 Edward Vrdolyak (D, then R) was an alderman from 1971 to 1987.  In 2008 he pleaded guilty to conspiracy to commit mail and wire fraud for accepting a 1.5 million dollar kickback in a real estate scheme.  He was sentenced to ten months in prison.  In 2019 Vrdolyak pleaded guilty to charges of income tax evasion connected to the state of Illinois's tobacco lawsuit settlement in the 1990s.  He was sentenced to another 18 months in prison.
Isaac "Ike" Carothers (D) was an alderman from 1999 to 2010.  He resigned after pleading guilty to accepting $40,000 in home improvements for backing a controversial project in his ward.  He was sentenced to 28 months in prison.  Isaac Carothers is the son of William Carothers, an alderman who was convicted of a similar crime in 1983.
 Willie Cochran (D), a former police officer, was elected alderman in 2007.  In 2016 he was charged in a 15-count indictment with stealing funds "meant for poor children and seniors", taking bribes, and other crimes. In 2019 he pleaded guilty to one count of wire fraud.  He was sentenced to one year in prison.
Ricardo Muñoz (D) was an alderman from 1993 to 2019.  In 2021 he pleaded guilty to wire fraud and money laundering, admitting that he had spent cash from a political fund on personal items such as sports tickets, meals and travel. In 2022 he was sentenced to 13 months in prison.
Patrick Daley Thompson (D) is the grandson of Richard J. Daley and the nephew of Richard M. Daley, both of whom served as mayor of Chicago.  Thompson was the alderman of the 11th Ward from 2015 to 2022.  He resigned after being convicted in federal court of income tax evasion and of lying to regulators about a bank line of credit that he received. He was sentenced to four months in prison.

References

Illinois
Political history of Illinois